Tagbilaran Broadcasting System (also known as Community Media Network) is a Philippine radio network. Its corporate office is located at CAP Bldg., J. Borja St. cor. Carlos P. Garcia Ave., Tagbilaran.

TBS Stations

AM Stations

FM Stations

TV Stations

References

Philippine radio networks